Der Spiegel (online) is a German news website. Before the renaming in January 2020, the website's name was Spiegel Online (short SPON).

It was founded in 1994 as the online offshoot of the German news magazine, Der Spiegel, with a staff of journalists working independently of the magazine. Today, it is the most frequently quoted online media product in Germany. Spiegel Online International, a section featuring articles translated into English, was launched in autumn 2004. In 2019, its editorial office was merged with the one of the printed Spiegel and in 2020, the website was renamed accordingly.

Company and editorial staff
The news website Der Spiegel (online) is run by Der Spiegel GmbH & Co. KG (formerly Spiegel Online GmbH & Co. KG), itself a wholly owned subsidiary of Spiegel-Verlag. The editorial offices of the news website and the print magazine Der Spiegel were separate operations, that had their own offices, authors and content until January 2020. Now, content for both media is created by a shared editorial team. 

Der Spiegel (online) has a record of profitability. Regular staff includes 150 people in the Hamburg headquarters, complemented by freelancers, and domestic and international news bureaus. In the German capital, Berlin, 15 correspondents cover the German federal government, political parties, corporations and artists. The Munich and Düsseldorf offices have one correspondent each. There are journalists based in Washington, D.C., New York, London, Moscow, New Delhi and Istanbul. The online news staff also receives support from Der Spiegel magazine's network of correspondents in Germany and abroad. The site also uses content from news agencies such as AFP, AP, dpa and Reuters.

Wolfgang Büchner was editor-in-chief of Der Spiegel and Der Spiegel (online) from September 2013 to December 2014. Büchner's former deputies, Florian Harms and Barbara Hans, headed Der Spiegel (online) after Büchner left the company. On 13 January 2015, Harms was appointed sole editor-in-chief. After Florian Harms had to leave the company on 6 December 2016, Barbara Hans was promoted to editor-in-chief.

History

Online journalism pioneer 
The news website first went up on 25 October 1994 under the name Spiegel Online, making it the first online presence of an established news magazine, one day before the Time site. Spiegel Online started as a service on CompuServe. The web domain spiegel.de was established one year later. Spiegel Onlines content initially consisted of hand-picked articles from the print magazine. As early as 1995, however, original content first appeared in a section called "Scanner", which was only available online. In the following year, Spiegel Online was relaunched and commenced featuring breaking news as well.

Rebranding in 2020 
In 2019, its editorial office was merged with the printed Der Spiegel. In January 2020, the website was rebranded, now using the same media brand as the printed format.

Popularity 
Currently, Der Spiegel (online) is included in the top 30 most-visited websites in Germany. It is among the five widest-reaching news website in Germany.

See also
 List of magazines in Germany

References

External links
 News website Der Spiegel (online)
 International part of the website

1994 establishments in Germany
Der Spiegel
German-language websites
German news websites
Magazines established in 1994
Magazines published in Hamburg